Daisy Romualdez (born Margarita Romualdez) is Filipino actress. She is sister of Blanca Gomez and are both of Spanish blood. She is married to well known former basketball player Manny Paner. She has two adopted daughters, Danita Paner, now a rock diva, and Kristina Paner.

Filmography

Movies 
Shake Rattle & Roll 2 (1990) Dra. Kalbaryo (segment "Kulam")
Katawang alabok (1979)
Anak ng aswang (1973)
The Blackbelter (1968)
Karate Fighters (1968)
Ngayon lamang ako dumalangin (1968)
Hinango kita sa lusak (1967)
Show of Shows (1964)
Si Darna at ang babaeng impakta (1963)
Kaming mga talyada (1962)
Sa bawat punglo (1962)
Salamat po doktor (1960)
Pakiusap (1959)
Silveria (1958)
Tatlong ilaw sa dambana (1958)
Ulilang angel (1958)
Bituing marikit (1957)
Hong Kong Holiday (1957)
Ligaw na bulaklak, Mga (1957)
Chabacano (1956)
Vacacionista (1956)

References 
 

Filipino film actresses
Filipino people of Spanish descent
Living people
Year of birth missing (living people)